The following table associates tree species, wood name and wood colour. 

Dipterocarpaceae
Wood